Gulargambone Parish, New South Wales is a bounded rural locality of Coonamble Shire and a civil parish of Gowen County, a cadastral division of New South Wales.
The only town of the county is Gulargambone.

The Parish is on the banks of the Castlereagh River and the main settlement of the parish is Gulargambone, New South Wales.

References

Localities in New South Wales
Geography of New South Wales
Central West (New South Wales)